Valeriya Gavriilovna Zaklunna-Myronenko (15 August 1942, Stalingrad – 22 October 2016, Kyiv) was a Soviet and Ukrainian actress and politician. A member of the Communist Party of Ukraine, she was a co-winner, with other members of the cast of the film To The Last Minute, of the 1975 Shevchenko National Prize.

Awards
People's Artist of the Ukrainian SSR (1979)
People's Artist of Russia (22 May 2004). 
USSR State Prize (1979)
Hero of Ukraine (2012)

References

External links
 
 Valeriya Zaklunna profile; accessed 22 October 2016 

1942 births
2016 deaths
Actors from Volgograd
20th-century Ukrainian actresses
20th-century Ukrainian women politicians
Soviet actresses
Communist Party of Ukraine politicians
Recipients of the Shevchenko National Prize
Recipients of the USSR State Prize
Third convocation members of the Verkhovna Rada
Fourth convocation members of the Verkhovna Rada
Fifth convocation members of the Verkhovna Rada
Ukrainian actor-politicians
Recipients of the title of Hero of Ukraine
People's Artists of Russia
Moscow Art Theatre School alumni
Politicians from Volgograd
Women members of the Verkhovna Rada
Burials at Baikove Cemetery